In network theory, a giant component is a connected component of a given random graph that contains a significant fraction of the entire graph's vertices.

More precisely, in graphs drawn randomly from a probability distribution over arbitrarily large graphs, a giant component is a connected component whose fraction of the overall number of vertices is bounded away from zero. In sufficiently dense graphs distributed according to the Erdős–Rényi model, a giant component exists with high probability.

Giant component in Erdős–Rényi model
Giant components are a prominent feature of the Erdős–Rényi model (ER) of random graphs, in which each possible edge connecting pairs of a given set of  vertices is present, independently of the other edges, with probability . In this model, if  for any constant , then with high probability (in the limit as  goes to infinity) all connected components of the graph have size , and there is no giant component. However, for  there is with high probability a single giant component, with all other components having size .

Giant component is also important in percolation theory. When a fraction of nodes, is removed randomly from an ER network of degree , there exists a critical threshold, . Above  there exists a giant component (largest cluster) of size, .  fulfills, .

At , the distribution of cluster sizes behaves as a power law, ~ which is a feature of phase transition.

Alternatively, if one adds randomly selected edges one at a time, starting with an empty graph, then it is not until approximately  edges have been added that the graph contains a large component, and soon after that the component becomes giant. However, according to the coupon collector's problem,  edges are needed in order to have high probability that the whole random graph is connected.

Graphs with arbitrary degree distributions 
A similar sharp threshold between parameters that lead to graphs with all components small and parameters that lead to a giant component also occurs in random graphs with non-uniform degree distributions.
The degree distribution does not define a graph uniquely. 
However under assumption that in all respects other than their degree distribution,
the graphs are treated as entirely random, many results on finite/infinite-component sizes are known.  
In this model, the existence of the giant component depends only on the first two (mixed) moments of the degree distribution. Similar expressions are also valid for directed graphs, in which case the degree distribution is two-dimensional. There are three types of connected components in directed graphs. For a randomly chosen vertex:

 out-component is a set of vertices that can be reached by recursively following all out-edges forward;
 in-component is a set of vertices that can be reached by recursively following all in-edges backward;
 weak component is a set of vertices that can be reached by recursively following all edges regardless of their direction.

Criteria for giant component existence in directed and undirected configuration graphs 
Let a randomly chosen vertex has  in-edges and  out edges. By definition, the average number of in- and out-edges coincides so that .
The criteria for giant component existence in directed and undirected random graphs are given in the table below:

See also

 Erdős–Rényi model
 Fractals
 Graph theory
 Interdependent networks
 Percolation theory
 Percolation
 Complex Networks
 Network Science
 Scale free networks

References

Graph connectivity
Random graphs